Korçë Airfield  was an aerodrome serving Korçë, a city in southeastern Albania. As of 2022, it is reported as being closed.

See also
 List of airports in Albania

References

External links

Airports in Albania
Buildings and structures in Korçë